George Stayley Brown (November 20, 1827 – September 12, 1915) was a ship owner, historian and political figure in Nova Scotia. He represented Yarmouth township in the Nova Scotia House of Assembly from 1863 to 1866 as a Reformer.

Biography
He was born in Yarmouth, Nova Scotia, the son of Stayley Brown, a member of the Legislative Council, and Charlotte Letitia Fletcher. In 1856, he married Elizabeth Bond. Brown was a director and president of the Acadian Marine Insurance Company. He served as a justice of the peace and as a member of the Central Board of Agriculture. Brown was consul for Spain in Yarmouth in 1869. He moved to Boston around 1875. He published Yarmouth, Nova Scotia : a sequel to Campbell's history in 1888. He died in Boston at the age of 87.

References 
 A Directory of the Members of the Legislative Assembly of Nova Scotia, 1758-1958, Public Archives of Nova Scotia (1958)

External links 
 
 Brown, George S Yarmouth, Nova Scotia : a sequel to Campbell's history (1888)

1827 births
1915 deaths
Nova Scotia Liberal Party MLAs
People from Yarmouth, Nova Scotia